B27 may refer to:
 Bundesstraße 27, a German road
 HLA-B27, an HLA B serotype
 Mark 27 nuclear bomb
 Martin XB-27, a proposed experimental American aircraft
 Blog 27, a Polish teen pop band